Two for the Seesaw is a 1962 American romantic-drama film directed by Robert Wise and starring Robert Mitchum and Shirley MacLaine. It was adapted from the 1958 Broadway play written by William Gibson with Henry Fonda and Anne Bancroft (who was awarded the 1958 Tony Award for Best Featured Actress in a Play) in the lead roles.

Plot
Jerry Ryan (Mitchum) is a lawyer from Nebraska who has recently separated from his wife. To get away from it all, he has moved to a shabby apartment in New York. He is struggling with the divorce, which has been filed but is not final, and takes long walks at night.

At a party, he meets Gittel Mosca (MacLaine), a struggling dancer. They instantly get along, and begin to fall in love. But the relationship is hampered by their differences in background and temperament.

Jerry gets a job with a New York law firm and prepares to take the bar examination. He helps Gittel rent a loft for a dance studio, which she rents out to other dancers. But their relationship is stormy, and Jerry has difficulty separating himself emotionally from his wife.

They prepare to move in together nevertheless, but Gittel is upset when she learns that the divorce came through and Jerry did not tell her about it. Jerry explains that even though he is divorced from his former wife on paper, they remain bonded in many ways. He and Gittel decide he needs to return to Nebraska.

Cast
 Robert Mitchum as Jerry Ryan
 Shirley MacLaine as Gittel Mosca
 Edmon Ryan as Frank Taubman
 Elisabeth Fraser as Sophie
 Eddie Firestone as Oscar
 Billy Gray as Mister Jacoby

Production
The play was acquired for $350,000 plus a percentage of its earning.

Paul Newman was originally slated to star opposite Elizabeth Taylor in the film. When Taylor was forced to drop out because of shooting overruns on Cleopatra, Newman was free to take the role of 'Fast Eddie' Felson in The Hustler.

"Second Chance", the title tune, became a pop music and jazz standard, recorded by Ella Fitzgerald and other artists. At the 35th Academy Awards, the "Song From Two for the Seesaw (Second Chance)" from Two for the Seesaw – Music by André Previn; Lyric by Dory Langdon was nominated for Best Original Song but lost to Days of Wine and Roses. The movie was also nominated for Best Cinematography, Black and White (Ted D. McCord). However, The Longest Day (Jean Bourgoin and Walter Wottitz) triumphed over it.

MacLaine later claimed that she and Mitchum began a relationship during the filming of this film that lasted three years.

The film was due to be shot over 60 days at the Samuel Goldwyn Studio in West Hollywood, California plus location shooting in New York.

See also
 List of American films of 1962

References

External links

1962 films
1962 romantic drama films
American romantic drama films
American black-and-white films
1960s English-language films
Films scored by André Previn
American films based on plays
Films directed by Robert Wise
Films produced by Walter Mirisch
Films set in New York City
Films shot in New York City
United Artists films
Two-handers
1960s American films
Films produced by Robert Wise